Wu Jiaxiang (born 7 October 1955) is a Chinese scholar, writer, and public intellectual. Wu once served in various political roles in the Chinese government. He is visiting scholar at the Fairbank Center for East Asian Research at Harvard University.

Biography
Wu was born and raised in Datong Town of Tongling County, Anhui. After the Cultural Revolution, he entered Peking University, majoring in economics. After graduation, he was assigned to the Publicity Department of the Communist Party of China as an official, then he worked in the Secretariat of the Communist Party of China and General Office of the Communist Party of China. In 1989, during the Tiananmen Square protests of 1989, he was arrested by the Beijing Public Security Bureau and put in Qincheng Prison. He was subsequently freed in 1992. In 2000, he became a visiting scholar at the Fairbank Center for East Asian Research at Harvard University.

Work
 The Empire In A Nutshell

References

External links

1955 births
People from Tongling
Living people
Peking University alumni
Writers from Anhui